Siphonodon australis, also known as ivorywood or scrub guava, is a species of plant in the bittersweet family. It is native to north-eastern Australia.

Infrataxa
 Siphonodon australis var. australis Benth.
 Siphonodon australis var. keysii F.M.Bailey

Description
The species grows as a tree up to 30 m in height. The leaves are 4.5–12 cm long by 2.5–2.5 cm wide. The small white flowers grow as a 1–3 flowered inflorescence 10–20 mm long. The hard yellow fruits are about 2.5–4 cm long and contain 6–2.5 mm seeds.

Distribution and habitat
The species is found in north-eastern and south-eastern Queensland, extending into north-eastern New South Wales. It occurs in drier rainforest and monsoon forest from sea level to an elevation of 900 m.

References

 
australis
Endemic flora of Australia
Flora of Queensland
Flora of New South Wales
Rosids of Australia
Plants described in 1863
Taxa named by George Bentham